Richard de Quina (born October 20, 1980), popularly known as Richie de Quina, is the Vice President for marketing of MyPhone, the leading local mobile brand in the Philippines. He is also the CEO of the first Korean Ginseng soap in the Philippines, Rejuv Ginseng.

Early life

Career

See also
 MyPhone

References

1980 births
Filipino Roman Catholics
Living people